Ina Wilde (born 8 March 1990), is a German woman's international motorcycle trials rider. Ina is four times German Women's Trials Champion, winning in 2010, 2012, 2013 and 2014. In 2014, she also won the European Women's Championship.

Biography
Wilde was runner-up to Gas-Gas rider Rosita Leotta in the 2008 German Women's Trials Championship, and again in 2009 before clinching the title in 2010. In 2011, she contested only the FIM Trial European Championship and the FIM Trial World Championship before returning to domestic competition in 2012, winning the German Women's title in 2012, 2013 and again in 2014.
Wilde scored her best World Championship finish in the final round of the 2014 series in Andorra, scoring a 4th place which landed her 6th in the championship final standings.

National Trials Championship Career

International Trials Championship Career

Honors

 German Women's Trials Champion 2010, 2012, 2013, 2014
 European Women's Trials Champion 2014

References 

1990 births
Living people
People from Schwerte
Sportspeople from Arnsberg (region)
German motorcycle racers
Motorcycle trials riders
Female motorcycle racers
German sportswomen